QDR may refer to:

Science and technology
 QDR, a Q code request for heading (bearing)
 Quad data rate, a communication signaling technique
 InfiniBand, a computer network communications link used in high-performance computing
 Quad Data Rate SRAM, a type of computer memory that transfers data using QDR

Other uses
 Quadrennial Defense Review, a former four-yearly review of US military objectives
 Qatar Domain Registry, the operator of the .qa ccTLD
 WQDR-FM, a US radio station
 Queda de Rins (literally "fall on the kidneys"), in the list of capoeira techniques

See also
 Qualified domestic relations order (QDRO), a judicial order in the United States